Walter Bruyninckx (pronounced Brer-ninks; born 27 August 1932) is a Belgian jazz discographer, musicologist, jazz historian, author, and journalist.

Career highlights 
While living in Mechelen, Belgium, in 1948, Bruyninckx co-founded a jazz club there while working as a newspaper journalist.  He later worked for UNICEF. After a serious car accident in 1965 in India, and during a period of convalescence in 1966, Bruyninckx developed a strong interest in jazz discography.  After conferring with discographer Albert McCarthy and major record collectors, Bruyninckx published 50 Years of Recorded Jazz, 1917–1967 — which included blues, gospel, and ragtime covers.  His work was supported by a larger group of volunteers.

For his third edition — 70 Years of Recorded Jazz — Bruyninckx published 35 volumes of genre-specific discographies, initially for the Japanese market, of which 5 volumes covered progressive jazz (fusion, free Jazz, third stream), 4 volumes covered singers, 12 volumes covered swing and dance bands, 6 volumes covered traditional jazz, 6 volumes covered modern jazz (bebop, hard bop, West Coast), and 2 volumes covered modern jazz big bands.

Duration of discography project 
Bruyninckx's discography is the longest running comprehensive jazz discography project.  Other long standing discography projects include those of Tom Lord, based in the Vancouver area of British Columbia, Canada (active  years — since 1992) and Erik Raben of Denmark (active  years — since 1989), and Jørgen Grunnet Jepsen (de) of Denmark (died 1981).  Bruyninckx announced that he would stop after the 2007 edition, but left it open whether the publication would continue by someone else, namely his sons Lucien and Dominique Truffandier.

Selected works 
Print (self-published)
 50 Years of Recorded Jazz, 1917–1967 (19 volumes; published between 1967 and 1975); 
 60 Years of Recorded Jazz, 1917–1877 (2nd ed., 16 volumes; published 1979); 
 70 Years of Recorded Jazz, 1917–1987 (3rd ed., published 1999); 

 Jazz: The Vocalists, 1917–1986: Singers & Crooners (4 volumes; published between 1988 and 1990);  
 Vol. 1, Vocalists Discography, 1917–1986: A – Du (1988); 
 Vol. 2, Vocalists Discography, 1917–1986: Du – Le (1990); 
 Vol. 3, Vocalists Discography, 1917–1986: Le – Si (1990); 
 Vol. 4, Vocalists Discography, 1917–1988: Si – Z; Musicians Index (1990); 

 Jazz: Traditional Jazz, 1897–1985: Origins, New Orleans, Dixieland, Chicago Styles (6 volumes; published between 1987 and 1990);  
 Vol. 1, Traditional Jazz, 1897–1985: A – Cr (1987); 
 Vol. 2, Traditional Jazz, 1897–1985: Cr – Hu (1987); 
 Vol. 3, Traditional Jazz, 1897–1987: Hu – Mu (1989); 
 Vol. 4, Traditional Jazz, 1897–1987: Mu – Ro (1989); 
 Vol. 5, Traditional Jazz, 1897–1988: Ro – Ye (1990); 
 Vol. 6, Traditional Jazz, 1897–1988: Ye – Z; Musicians Index (1990); 

 Jazz: Swing, 1920–1985: Swing, Dance Bands & Combos (12 volumes; published between 1986 and 1990); 
 Vol. 1, Swing Discography, 1920–1985: A – Ba (1986); 
 Vol. 2, Swing Discography, 1920–1985: Ba – Ca (1986); 
 Vol. 3, Swing Discography, 1920–1985: Ca – Dy (1987); 
 Vol. 4, Swing Discography, 1920–1985: Ea – Go (1987); 
 Vol. 5, Swing Discography, 1920–1985: Go – He (1988); 
 Vol. 6, Swing Discography, 1920–1985: He – Jo (1988); 
 Vol. 7, Swing Discography, 1920–1985: Jo – Ma (1989); 
 Vol. 8, Swing Discography, 1920–1985: Ma – Po (1989); 
 Vol. 9, Swing Discography, 1920–1988: Po – Se (1989); 
 Vol. 10, Swing Discography, 1920–1988: Se – Th (1989); 
 Vol. 11, Swing Discography, 1920–1988: Th – Wi (1990); 
 Vol. 12, Swing Discography, 1920–1988: Wi – Z; Musicians Index (1990); 

 Modern Jazz: Be-Bop, Hard Bop, West Coast (6 volumes; published between 1984 and 1987); 
 Vol. 1, Discography: A – Do (1984); 
 Vol. 2, Modern Discography: Do – Ha (ca. 1985); 
 Vol. 3, Modern Discography: Ha – Mc (ca. 1995); 
 Vol. 4, Modern Discography: Mc – Pe (1986); 
 Vol. 5, Modern Discography: Pe – Sm (1986); 
 Vol. 6, Modern Discography: Sm – Z; Musicians Index (1987); 

 Modern Jazz: Modern Big Band, (discography; 2 volumes; published between 1985 and 1989); 
 Vol. 1, Modern Big Band Discography: A – K (1984); 
 Vol. 2, Modern Big Band Discography: Ke – Z; Musicians Index (1989); 

 Progressive Jazz: Free, Third Stream, Fusion (5 volumes; published between 1984 and 1989); 
 Vol. 1, Progressive Discography: A – Di (1984); 
 Vol. 2, Progressive Discography: Di – Li (ca. 1985);  
 Vol. 3, Progressive Discography: Li – Sh (1986); 
 Vol. 4, Progressive Discography: Sh – Z (and additions A – Ba) (1988); 
 Vol. 5, Progressive Discography: Index (and further additions A – L (1989); 

CD-ROM
 85 Years of Recorded Jazz (1917–2002, A–Z, Complete), compiled & edited by Walter Bruyninckx & Dominique Truffandier (2004); 
 90 Years of Recorded Jazz & Blues, 1917–2007 (prejazz, 1897–1917, A to Z, Complete), compiled & edited by Walter Bruyninckx & Lucien Bruyninckx (2007); 
 93 Years of Recorded Jazz & Blues, 1917–2010 (prejazz 1897–1917), A to Z, Complete), compiled & edited by Walter Bruyninckx, Lucien Bruyninckx, & Domi Truffandier (2010);

References 

1932 births
Living people
20th-century Belgian historians
Belgian musicologists
Discographers
Historians of jazz
Jazz writers
Music historians